The Marconi Prize is an annual award recognizing achievements and advancements made in field of communications (radio, mobile, wireless, telecommunications, data communications, networks, and Internet). The prize is awarded by the Marconi Society and it includes a $100,000 honorarium and a work of sculpture. Recipients of the prize are awarded at the Marconi Society's annual symposium and gala.

Occasionally, the Marconi Society Lifetime Achievement Award is bestowed on legendary late-career individuals, recognizing their transformative contributions and remarkable impacts to the field of communications and to the development of the careers of students, colleagues and peers, throughout their lifetimes. So far, the recipients include Claude E. Shannon (2000, died in 2001), William O. Baker (2003, died in 2005), Gordon E. Moore (2005), Amos E. Joel Jr. (2009, died in 2008), Robert W. Galvin (2011, died in 2011), and Thomas Kailath (2017).

Criteria 
The Marconi Prize is awarded based on the candidate’s contributions in the following areas:

 The significance of the impact of the nominee’s work on widely-used technology.
 The scientific importance of the nominee’s work in setting the stage for, influencing, and advancing the field beyond the nominee’s own achievements.
 The nominee’s contributions to innovation and entrepreneurship by introducing completely new ideas, methods, or technologies. These may include forming, leading, or advising organizations, mentoring students on moving ideas from research to implementation, or fostering new industries/enabling scale implementation.
 The social and humanitarian impact of the nominee’s contributions to the design, development, and/or deployment of new communication technologies or communications public policies that promote social development and/or inclusiveness.

Marconi Fellow 
The Marconi Prize winners are also named as Marconi Fellows. The foundation and the prize are named after the honor of Guglielmo Marconi, a Nobel laureate and one of the pioneers of radio communications. Recipients of the Marconi Prize are also expected to pursue further creative work to advance the understanding and development of communications technology for the benefit of mankind.

List of Marconi Prize winners 
Past winners of the Marconi Prize include Lawrence E. Page and Sergey Brin for the development of web search company Google, Tim Berners-Lee for his leadership and innovations in the World Wide Web, Nobel Laureate Charles K. Kao for developing fiber-optic communications, and Martin Hellman and Whitfield Diffie for their work in security - the Diffie–Hellman key exchange. The first award was given in 1975.

1975–1996
 1975: James Rhyne Killian
 1976: Hiroshi Inose
 1977: Arthur Leonard Schawlow
 1978: Edward Colin Cherry
 1979: John Robinson Pierce
 1980: Yash Pal
 1981: Seymour Papert
 1982: Arthur C. Clarke
 1983: Francesco Carassa
 1984: Eric Albert Ash
 1985: Charles Kuen Kao
 1986: Leonard Kleinrock
 1987: Robert Wendell Lucky
 1988: Federico Faggin
 1989: Robert N. Hall
 1990: Andrew J. Viterbi
 1991: Paul Baran
 1992: James L. Flanagan
 1993: Izuo Hayashi
 1994: Robert E. Kahn
 1995: Jacob Ziv
 1996: Gottfried Ungerboeck

1997–present
 1997: G. David Forney, Jr.
 1998: Vinton G. Cerf
 1999: James L. Massey
 2000: Martin Hellman and Whitfield Diffie
 2001: Herwig Kogelnik and Allan Snyder
 2002: Tim Berners-Lee
 2003: Robert Metcalfe and Robert G. Gallager
 2004: Sergey Brin and Lawrence Page
 2005: Claude Berrou
 2006: John M. Cioffi
 2007: Ronald L. Rivest
 2008: David N. Payne
 2009: Andrew Chraplyvy and Robert Tkach
 2010: Charles Geschke and John Warnock
 2011: Jack Wolf and Irwin M. Jacobs
 2012: Henry Samueli
 2013: Martin Cooper
 2014: Arogyaswami Paulraj
 2015: Peter Kirstein
 2016: Bradford Parkinson
 2017: Arun Netravali
 2018: F. Thomson Leighton
 2019: Paul Kocher and Taher Elgamal
 2020: Andrea Goldsmith
 2022: Siavash Alamouti
 2023: Hari Balakrishnan

See also
 List of engineering awards
 NAB Marconi Radio Awards

References

External links
 The Marconi Foundation website
 Who Invented Radio?
 Technology's top honors, awards and prizes, including the Marconi Prize

Electrical and electronic engineering awards
Guglielmo Marconi